The 1966 Minnesota Golden Gophers football team represented the University of Minnesota in the 1966 Big Ten Conference football season. In their 13th year under head coach Murray Warmath, the Golden Gophers compiled a 4–5–1 record and were outscored by their opponents by a combined total of 160 to 124. 
 
Linebacker Tim Wheeler received the team's Most Valuable Player award. Defensive lineman Ron Kamzelski and defensive lineman Bob Stein were named Academic All-Big Ten.

Total attendance at five home games was 248,248, an average of 49,600 per game. The largest crowd was against Iowa.

Schedule

References

Minnesota
Minnesota Golden Gophers football seasons
Minnesota Golden Gophers football